Gusztáv Tőry (24 October 1857 – 31 October 1925) was a Hungarian politician and jurist, who served as Minister of Justice in 1918. He was the chairman of the Court from 1920 to 1925.

References
 Magyar Életrajzi Lexikon

1857 births
1925 deaths
Justice ministers of Hungary